This Is Where I Stand is a 2002 album by Eastbourne-based indie rock trio easyworld. The album contained 4 singles - Try Not To Think, Bleach, You & Me and Junkies, with a considerable growth in commercial success between each, the latter single even managing to reach #40 in the UK charts. Notably, the album included five re-recorded versions of songs that had previously appeared on their first e.p. - Better Ways to Self Destruct.

The album was released in the summer of 2002 to fairly positive, though not overwhelming, critical acclaim, and the band quickly built a dedicated fanbase during this period.

Track listing
 Armistice
 Try Not To Think
 100 Weight
 Junkies & Whores
 This is Where I Stand
 A Stain To Never Fade
 Demons
 By the Sea
 Bleach
 You & Me
 You Were Right

2002 albums
Easyworld albums